Iridosma is a monotypic genus of flowering plants belonging to the family Simaroubaceae. The only species is Iridosma letestui.

Its native range is Gabon.

References

Simaroubaceae
Monotypic Sapindales genera
Taxa named by André Aubréville
Taxa named by François Pellegrin